"Johnny Boy" is a song by American alternative band Twenty One Pilots. The song was first released on the band's demo tapes, and later officially released on their self-titled debut studio album, Twenty One Pilots.

Meaning 
In a 2020 interview, the father of band frontman Tyler Joseph, Chris Joseph, revealed the meaning of the song. Around the time the song was recorded, the United States was going through an economic recession, causing Joseph to become unemployed. "I was an admissions director and they said ‘Hey, we gotta get rid of this position.’ And I was without a job for a while. A lot of people were out of work at that time."

Reception 
Writers from Cleveland.com wrote about the song, saying "(It) remains a fan-favorite for Twenty One Pilots diehards. It's by no means the band's best song, but it feels like Tyler Joseph going for a Jack's Mannequin moment. The song is also the centerpiece of the band's debut."

The song has 78 million streams on Spotify as of January 2022, and is featured on the band's essential playlist.

Personnel 
 Tyler Joseph – vocals, organs, piano, keyboards, programming, synthesizers, production
 Nick Thomas – guitars, bass, programming
 Chris Salih – drums, percussion

References 

Twenty One Pilots songs
Songs written by Tyler Joseph
2009 songs
Emo songs